Stephen Holbrook (born 16 September 1952) is an English former footballer who made 119 appearances in the Football League for Hull City and Darlington in the 1970s. He played on the right wing. He went on to play non-league football for Gateshead.

Life and career
Holbrook was born in Richmond, Yorkshire, where he attended Richmond Secondary Modern School. He was capped several times for England Schoolboys. He scored the winning goal against their Welsh counterparts, and the Times gave him a glowing report, albeit in a losing cause, against the German Schoolboys at Wembley in April 1968:

He began his football career as an apprentice with Hull City, and made his first-team debut for the club on 7 November 1970, in a 2–0 home defeat to Luton Town in the Second Division. After playing just twice more over the next 18 months, he moved on to Fourth Division club Darlington. Over five seasons with Darlington, he played 131 matches in all competitions and scored 13 goals, all but one in the league. That goal came in the 1975–76 League Cup against Sheffield Wednesday, newly relegated from the Second Division. Darlington had lost the home leg 2–0, but in the second leg, at Wednesday's Hillsborough ground, Holbrook opened the scoring in the second half, the match ended 2–2, and Darlington won the replay and went on to reach the last 32 of the competition. Speaking 25 years later, he described the goal as "An absolute pearler. I wouldn't care, I was whinging to the referee because someone was pulling me back and he just said 'There's the ball' and I hit it. Afterwards we were running back and the ref asked me if I was satisfied. After winning at Hillsborough, I think I probably was."

Holbrook made a transfer request in 1977, left the club and signed with Gateshead, playing in the Northern Premier League. He scored 34 goals from 156 appearances in senior competition for Gateshead over six seasons, in the last of which they won the Northern Premier League title.

Holbrook's employment after retiring from football included operating a car hire company in Darlington.

References

1952 births
Living people
People from Richmond, North Yorkshire
English footballers
Association football midfielders
Hull City A.F.C. players
Darlington F.C. players
Gateshead F.C. players
English Football League players
Northern Premier League players